Estonia competed at the 2002 Winter Olympics in Salt Lake City, United States.

Medalists

Biathlon

Men

Cross-country skiing

Men

Sprint

Women

Sprint

Figure skating

Nordic combined

Ski jumping

References

Official Olympic Reports
International Olympic Committee results database

External links
 EOK – Salt Lake City 2002 

Nations at the 2002 Winter Olympics
2002
Olympics